The Moody Barn is a round barn in Chisago Lake Township, Chisago County, Minnesota, United States.  The farm was first homesteaded in 1871 by Elof and Eva Modig, who emigrated from Sweden.  The couple raised five children and grew wheat on their farm, as was common in the 1870s.  By the 1890s Minnesota farming had begun to diversify, with cheese and butter production becoming popular and distributed by cooperative creameries.  In 1915 Charles Moody, one of the sons, decided to build a modern round barn.

The interior contains a  silo. The first floor of the barn housed milk cows and their calves, while the second floor was used to store hay. Instead of the traditional red and white paint, the Moody barn was painted in a blue-gray color. The construction cost was $3200, with seven men paid $1 per day plus meals for the construction.

The accompanying farm house was moved from the west side of the road to the east side in 2004. The barn and farm house are now owned by the Chisago Lakes Township and managed by the Chisago County Historical Society.  The barn has been repainted and reshingled, and is situated in the  Moody Lake Park.  The barn is the last remaining round barn in Chisago County.

References

External links

 National Register inventory form

Barns on the National Register of Historic Places in Minnesota
Buildings and structures in Chisago County, Minnesota
Round barns in Minnesota
National Register of Historic Places in Chisago County, Minnesota
Buildings and structures completed in 1915
1915 establishments in Minnesota